A partial solar eclipse occurred on May 19–20, 1985. A solar eclipse occurs when the Moon passes between Earth and the Sun, thereby totally or partly obscuring the image of the Sun for a viewer on Earth. A partial solar eclipse occurs in the polar regions of the Earth when the center of the Moon's shadow misses the Earth.
It was visible near sunrise on May 20th over Japan and northeast Russia, and ending at sunset on May 19th over north Canada and Greenland. May 19 is the 139th (140th in leap years) day of the year in Gregorian Calendar. There are 226 days remaining until the end of the year.

Related eclipses

Eclipses of 1985 
 A total lunar eclipse on May 4.
 A partial solar eclipse on May 19.
 A total lunar eclipse on October 28.
 A total solar eclipse on November 12.

Solar eclipses of 1982–1985

Metonic series

References

External links 

1985 5 19
1985 in science
1985 5 19
May 1985 events